Abigail Marjorie Lockhart, M.D. (née Wyczenski) is a fictional character from the NBC medical drama series ER, portrayed by Maura Tierney. Usually referred to as simply Abby, she first appears as a guest star in the first half of the sixth season, before becoming a main character later that season, appearing until the beginning of the fifteenth season. Tierney returned to make one final guest appearance later in season fifteen.

Beginnings 

The character Abby Lockhart first appears in season 6 of ER in the episode "Great Expectations", guest starring as Carol Hathaway's (Julianna Margulies) labor and delivery nurse. Three months later, she became a regular character. She first made an appearance in February 2000 as a third-year medical student beginning her ER rotation. On her first day, she meets Dr. Luka Kovač (Goran Visnjic), her first teacher, with whom she will experience a number of professional and personal relationships and who will become the most important character in her long-running story. Lockhart's first months in the ER prove challenging for her transitioning from OB nursing to the ER. In that time, she sees Carter stabbed and a medical student, Lucy Knight, killed by a patient with schizophrenia , and also has to speak to superiors Kerry Weaver (Laura Innes) and Mark Greene (Anthony Edwards) about John Carter's (Noah Wylie) growing drug addiction. Although Carter is hostile at first, he and Abby become friends over the course of the next season.

Abby's medical training had gone into hiatus and she had become a full-time obstetrics nurse to provide for her then-husband Richard Lockhart's medical school education, but once they divorced she resumed her medical training. At the start of season 7, Weaver breaks the news to her that her registration for her final year of medical school has been denied due to lack of payment. Abby confronts her ex-husband who has stopped paying her tuition because he is bankrupt. She resumes her part-time OB nursing job, and soon Weaver offers her a full-time ER nursing position. Abby accepts the offer. After several generally rewarding years as a nurse, Abby gets her ex-husband to sign off on a loan so she can finish medical school. The loan defaults, but John Carter pays the deficit. While she fails her first board certification exam, she passes on her second try, and she earns her MD in the Season 10 finale. At first Abby is left worried she failed again when she apparently never gets the results, but finally learns that they were sent to the hospital and Frank had simply failed to give Abby her mail. Abby's very first day as a doctor begins shortly after Abby learns that she passed her boards when Pratt and Chen fall victim to a road rage incident and Abby is called in as a doctor to help save her friends lives.

In the 2000–2001 season, Abby is visited by her mother, Maggie Wyczenski (Sally Field), who has bipolar disorder. Abby's childhood is revealed to have been very difficult: she was forced to cope with her mother's erratic behavior and long absences and had to take care of her younger brother Eric (Tom Everett Scott). Eric is introduced in later episodes. He is in the US Air Force but goes AWOL and is showing signs of bipolar disorder. He refuses to accept it and clashes with both Abby and Maggie as a result.  Abby eventually reconciles with her mother during the beginning of Season 13 as Maggie is taking medications for her disorder regularly, and Abby is grateful for her support when her son Joe is born prematurely.

Abby's father, Eddie, left the family when Abby was a child, due at least in part to Maggie's uncontrollable behavior. Abby reunites with her father (Fred Ward) in season 13, when he initially approaches her under the guise of being a patient named Eddie Jackson before finally revealing his true identity to her. Abby tells him to stay away from her, although she later considers inviting him to her wedding.

Abby dates Dr. Kovač, Dr. Carter and Jake, a medical student, but eventually returns to Kovač, with whom she has a son. They later marry. She befriends many colleagues in the ER throughout the series, co-workers such as Susan Lewis, and Kerry Weaver. Her closest friend is Dr. Neela Rasgotra, who graduates medical school with her and lives with her during some of Neela's hard times. As Carter is phased out of the show and Weaver departs midway through Season 13, Abby and Luka Kovač are the senior figures on the show until their departure in 2009.

Personal life 
Prior to beginning medical school at County, Abby was married to Richard Lockhart; she and Richard were expecting a child at one point, but Abby chose to have an abortion, since she was afraid the child would have bipolar disorder like her mother. Abby never told her family about the pregnancy and Richard was unaware of it until after the abortion. The marriage began to break down after a short time, with Richard frustrated at Abby's abortion and depression, and Abby angry over his insensitivity, since she was working overtime at home and at work to help pay for his medical schooling.  They finally split for good when Richard cheated on her and part of the divorce agreement was that he would pay for her medical schooling. Abby chose to keep her married name of Lockhart, claiming "it's the only good thing I got out of the whole mess."

Soon after taking the position in the ER, Abby begins a relationship with Dr. Luka Kovač, who is initially a mentor figure to her until she has to quit medical school. The beginning of their relationship is strained when they are attacked by a mugger on their first date, whom Luka kills in defense. She and Luka stay together for about a year, but their relationship becomes more strained after the arrival of Abby's mother and the increasing closeness between Abby and Dr. John Carter, and a heated argument leads to their break up at the beginning of the eighth season.

Despite an initial period of awkwardness and jealousy after their romance ends, Luka and Abby become good friends again. She criticizes him when he behaves badly towards other staff and during his subsequent depression but nonetheless from Seasons 9-11 the two are very close friends, although their mutual attraction is still sometimes visible. In season 8  Abby's neighbor, Brian, attacks her for protecting his abused wife, leaving Abby with a horribly bruised face.  After allowing her to recover at his apartment, Luka traces Brian to a bar and beats him to a pulp, threatening to kill him if he comes near Abby again.

Abby's next relationship is with Dr. John Carter. Abby discovers Carter shooting up on painkillers during season 6. She tells the senior doctors about it, and at their urging and with their help, Carter enters a rehab program. Once he returns, he sees Abby at an AA meeting. She tells him that she is a recovering alcoholic and had been sober for five years. She agrees to become his AA sponsor. Abby and Carter develop a very strong friendship, which strains her relationship with Luka. Several months later, Abby has a particularly horrible birthday and starts drinking again. When Carter catches her having a beer a few weeks after she was attacked, he confronts her, and she tells him not to worry about her. When Dr. Mark Greene passes away at the end of season 8, Carter seeks solace in Abby. She returns to her AA meetings, telling Carter she is doing it for him, and they are a couple throughout season 9. Abby continues drinking on occasion, however, and Carter compulsively tries to "fix" her. At one point, Carter is ready to propose to Abby at a special dinner he's arranged for her, but at the last minute, he puts the ring back in his pocket; although they discuss it briefly in a later episode, he never proposes again.  Their relationship is badly strained when Carter's grandmother (Frances Sternhagen) dies, and Abby's brother, Eric, conclusively diagnosed with bipolar disorder, acts out at the funeral and falls into the grave. Soon after, Carter flies to the Congo and joins Luka, who is volunteering with Doctors Without Borders.  On his return, Abby is extremely hostile towards him for leaving without explanation. When Carter goes to Africa for a second time to recover the body of Luka, who, in a plot twist, has not actually died, he sends Abby a break-up letter, and their relationship finally ends. Just as with the end of Luka and Abby's relationship, Abby and Carter remain close friends after a period of distance between them, especially when Carter returns to Chicago with his pregnant girlfriend Kem.

Abby briefly dates a medical student named Jake in season 11, but their relationship fizzles when Abby does not respond positively to Jake's desires to stay in Chicago to be with her. She also begins to grow closer in her friendships with Dr. Susan Lewis and Dr. Kerry Weaver.  While she is not especially close to Sam Taggart, they are usually on good terms.  Dr. Lucien Dubenko, Chief of Surgery, is attracted to her for some time, but Abby does not return his affections, seeing him as just a friend.  Nonetheless, Lucien remains rather protective of her for several seasons.

In season 12, Abby rekindles her relationship with Luka in the episode "The Human Shield" when her attempt to vent her frustration at him turns into a kiss and subsequently sleeping together. Initially, they decide to remain friends, but soon become lovers, noting that they always seem to find their way back to each other. Three weeks into their relationship, it is revealed that Abby is pregnant. Despite clearly wanting another child, his own having perished in Croatia, Luka states that he will support whatever choice she makes, as long as they can still remain together. After a week or so of uncertainty, Abby decides to keep the baby.  Luka proposes to Abby while she is pregnant, but Abby is not comfortable with the idea because of her past problems, and later claims she 'doesn't need a white dress' to prove she loves him. Their baby, a son named Josip (after Luka's father), or Joe for short (after Joe Frazier, the boxer whom Abby's long-disappeared father was a fan of) is born prematurely by emergency C-section at the beginning of season 13. Abby has to have an emergency hysterectomy. Joe spends several weeks in the hospital's NICU, requiring surgery during his stay. Abby and Luka's relationship becomes strained during this period, but they appear much happier in later episodes, caring for their now healthy baby boy.

Throughout season 13, Abby is shown growing into her role as Joe's mother, first by taking time off to be with her seriously ill baby, then by participating in activities like Mommy and Baby classes and walks in the park, and then later by gradually reintroducing herself into the ER world. Mid-season, tension develops between Abby and Luka, partly as the result of Luka's apparently paranoid behavior regarding Curtis Ames (Forest Whitaker), a disgruntled former patient who has sued Luka due to a stroke he suffered that cost him the use of his arm.  Not realizing that Ames approached her and Joe in the park posing as a friendly stranger, and has been stalking both her and Luka for some time after he lost the case, Abby brushes off Luka's concerns.  However, Ames breaks into Abby and Luka's apartment with a gun, and demands to see Luka. Abby tries to bargain with him, telling him that she is a recovering alcoholic, and recounting an occasion where she felt she had hit 'rock bottom'. Luka is taken hostage, threatened and has his hand crushed by Ames, but survives when Ames commits suicide. In the next episode, an emotional Abby asks Luka to propose to her again. She says if they got through the shooting incident and the Curtis Ames nightmare, they can get through anything - he proposes and the couple get engaged. Later Luka realises that Abby is hesitant about planning the wedding, so he decides to prepare a surprise wedding for her. At first, she has her doubts but eventually she agrees and asks Neela Rasgotra to be her maid of honor.

At the end of the thirteenth season, Abby and Luka plan to honeymoon in Hawaii. However, the night before they are due to depart, Luka receives a phone call from Croatia informing him that his father is ill, so the honeymoon is put on hold until Luka can return from his urgent trip abroad. After Luka's departure, Abby has a tough time with the stern new ER Chief Kevin Moretti (Stanley Tucci), who plans to mold the department into a more efficient and professional work environment, but Moretti quickly tells Abby he is very impressed with her work.  Despite this, she seems to dislike him more than many of the other residents. In season 14, Abby is struggling to deal with Luka's absence, raise Joe and work at the ER; in "Gravity", Joe is injured after falling off a jungle gym at the playground and Abby ends up relapsing at the episode's end. She approaches Dr. Janet Coburn (the O.B. Chief) who appears to have been her AA sponsor in the past. Abby's drinking problem continues to escalate, and she realizes how bad it is in "Blackout" when she shows up drunk to a party in honor of Pratt and Morris passing their boards. Abby finds herself waking up at 3am in Moretti's apartment realizing, after sobering up at the airport when trying to find a flight to Croatia to see Luka, that she slept with him.

Soon after Luka arrives back in Chicago, he gets news that his father has died. Abby tells Luka to take Joe to Croatia for the funeral while she seeks help for her alcoholism- though she does not initially reveal the infidelity that her blackout caused. Upon her return to the ER, Abby faces the reality of her situation; she must tell her co-workers the truth about her disease. The only negative reaction at work is from Sam (Linda Cardellini), who displays disgust at Abby's weakness, but the two women mend fences when Sam tells Abby she was being harsh because of her own long history of being around alcoholics who refused to clean up their lives.  Abby goes to Croatia and confesses her blackout and subsequent actions to Luka. Luka is angry that she cheated on him and put their son's life in danger.  When they return to the States, he decides to move out of the apartment, though he does not seek separation or divorce papers. He decides to work at a long-term care facility and soon has a change of heart about Abby's mistake, especially after a tense conversation with Dr. Moretti.  Moretti also attempts to apologize to Abby, but she coldly rebuffs him. At the conclusion of the 14th season, it would appear that Abby and Luka are willing to continue to work on their marriage, with Luka forgiving Abby with a kiss. Abby's happiness at this is tempered when the ambulance she walks past explodes, jarring her and mortally wounding her friend and colleague Dr. Gregory Pratt.

At the beginning of the 15th season, we learn that Abby has sought a position at a hospital in Boston where she and Luka plan to move with their son for a new start. In the third episode, Abby's secret that she has accepted the job and resigned from County is slowly revealed to the others in the ER, although Abby asks them to keep it secret because she does not want it to be a big deal. Long-serving nurse Haleh Adams shows the departing Abby a closet wall where all the past doctors and employees have put their locker name tags. Abby then adds both hers and Luka's tags to the wall. Abby finally leaves, saying goodbye to most of the staff who are gathered in the ambulance bay. She is picked up by Luka who has arrived in his car with their son.

Career as a doctor 
In 2003, Abby starts her final year of medical school and newcomer Samantha Taggart replaces her as the central nurse character on the show.  As both a nurse and later a doctor, Abby has a tendency for sarcasm towards troublesome patients (and her co-workers), but she exudes gentleness and security as well. Although she is not as intellectually gifted as Neela Rasgotra, John Carter, or Gregg Pratt, she has many years of experience and one of the highest patient-satisfaction scores.  It is a mark of Kerry Weaver's confidence in Abby that, when she has her hip-replacement surgery in Season 12, she asks Abby to be her son Henry's legal guardian if something happens to her. Towards the end of her final quarter of medical school, she is told that someone has anonymously paid off the balance on her tuition. She later discovers it was Carter. Abby goes on to graduate from medical school and finally becomes Dr. Abby Lockhart. By season 14, Abby is a fourth-year resident. She applies for an Attending position at County when she becomes frustrated by the endless delays and interviews for a position at an upscale medical facility, although this is partly because she wants to keep her options open if Luka decides to reconcile with her. She gets the other position, but Dr. Pratt uses his pull to get County to offer her the Attending position, which she accepts, one episode before Luka decides to forgive her.

After leaving with Luka to work in Boston, Abby appears once more in season 15 episode 20, "Shifting Equilibrium", during a phone call with Neela, who needs Abby's encouragement to leave County. Abby is seen in her new home looking after a group of young children for her after-shift daycare, including a three-year-old Joe.

References

External links
Official NBC Character Bio

ER (TV series) characters
Fictional nurses
Fictional alcohol abusers
Television characters introduced in 1999
Fictional female doctors